Mechanitis polymnia, the orange-spotted tiger clearwing or disturbed tigerwing, is a butterfly of the family Nymphalidae. It is found from Mexico to the Amazon rainforest. The larvae feed on Solanum species.

Subspecies
M. p. polymnia (Suriname, French Guiana, Brazil)
M. p. isthmia Bates, 1863 (Mexico, Panama, Costa Rica)
M. p. chimborazona Bates, 1864 (Ecuador)
M. p. lycidice Bates, 1864 (Mexico, Guatemala, Honduras)
M. p. veritabilis Butler, 1873 (Colombia, Venezuela)
M. p. dorissides Staudinger, [1884] (Peru)
M. p. casabranca Haensch, 1905 (Brazil (Minas Gerais))
M. p. eurydice Haensch, 1905 (Peru)
M. p. caucaensis Haensch, 1909 (Colombia)
M. p. werneri Hering, 1925 (Colombia)
M. p. angustifascia Talbot, 1928 (Peru, Brazil)
M. p. apicenotata Zikán, 1941 (Brazil (Amazonas))
M. p. mauensis Forbes, 1948 (Brazil (Pará))
M. p. proceriformis Bryk, 1953 (Peru)
M. p. bolivarensis Fox, 1967 (Venezuela)
M. p. kayei Fox, 1967 (Trinidad)

References

External links

Larvae and pupa

Butterflies described in 1758
Fauna of Brazil
Nymphalidae of South America
Taxa named by Carl Linnaeus
Ithomiini